Jolie L. Justus (born February 24, 1971) is an American lawyer and politician from Missouri. A Democrat, she was a member of the Missouri State Senate representing the 10th Senatorial District in Kansas City, serving as the Missouri Senate Minority Leader in her final two years.

Early life and education
A lawyer by trade, she was raised in Branson, Missouri, where she attended Branson High School. She then went on to earn degrees at Southwest Missouri State University in Springfield and the University of Missouri–Kansas City School of Law. In 2011, Justus completed Harvard University's John F. Kennedy School of Government program for Senior Executives in State and Local Government as a David Bohnett LGBTQ Victory Institute Leadership Fellow.

Career 
Jolie Justus was elected to the Missouri State Senate in 2006. She represented Kansas City and Grandview and currently serves as the director of pro bono services for the law firm of Shook, Hardy, & Bacon LLP. Under her direction, this company has been recognized as one of the Top 100 free legal services programs in the nation.

In 2015 Jolie Justus ran for Kansas City Council's 4th District seat to replace termed-out incumbent, Jan Marcason, and garnered 72% of the vote in the April 7 municipal primary. She won the June 23, 2015, Kansas City general election against her challenger, John Fierro, obtaining 76.4% of the votes. As a Kansas City Councilwoman, Justus is chair of the Airport Committee, co-chair of the Legislative Committee, and vice chair of the Finance Committee. She has also been a member of the Transportation & Infrastructure Committee, the City Market Oversight Committee, and the Midtown Housing Advisory Board.

Prior to her time on the Council, Justus was both the Senate Democratic Leader in Jefferson City, as well as the chair of the Senate Standing Committee on Progress and Development. She was also the ranking member of both the Judiciary Committee and the Senate’s Committee on Jobs, Economic Development and Local Government. Justus introduced the Childcare Assistance Foster Care Reform bill while in the Senate, that would allow for children who opted out of the foster care system early, to be allowed to re-enter state custody until they turned 21. She also sponsored the Missouri Nondiscrimination Act, known as MONA, that would ban discrimination based on a person’s sexual orientation or gender. In addition, Justus co-sponsored the reform of the Criminal Code in 2014, which was passed in to law.

Justus has also served as an adjunct professor at the UMKC School of Law since 2010.

She ran for Mayor of Kansas City in the 2019 Kansas City mayoral election, where she was defeated by Quinton Lucas.

Personal
Justus was the first openly gay member of the Missouri Senate and only the third ever publicly gay member of the Missouri General Assembly, after Representatives Tim Van Zandt (D-Kansas City), and Jeanette Mott Oxford (D-St. Louis).

References

External links 
 
Missouri Senate - Jolie Justus official government website
 
Follow the Money - Jolie Justus
2008 2006 campaign contributions

1971 births
21st-century American women politicians
21st-century American politicians
American women lawyers
Lawyers from Kansas City, Missouri
Lesbian politicians
American LGBT city council members
LGBT state legislators in Missouri
Living people
Missouri lawyers
Democratic Party Missouri state senators
Missouri State University alumni
People from Branson, Missouri
Politicians from Kansas City, Missouri
University of Missouri–Kansas City alumni
Women state legislators in Missouri